Castilleja School is an independent school for girls in grades six through twelve, located in Palo Alto, California. Castilleja is the only non-sectarian all-girls middle and high school in the San Francisco Bay Area. The faculty consists of approximately 70 full-time and part-time women and men. Castilleja is a member of the California Association of Independent Schools and the National Coalition of Girls' Schools.

History 
Castilleja was founded in 1907 by Mary Ishbel Lockey. Originally from Montana, Lockey graduated from Stanford University in 1902, where she majored in English. She was a charter member of Alpha Phi and was the first Stanford Alpha Phi elected to Phi Beta Kappa. She was encouraged by Stanford's first president, David Starr Jordan, to start a school that would offer girls a comprehensive, college preparatory education. In its early years, some boys were allowed to take classes at Castilleja.

The school's core values, known as "the 5 Cs," include conscience, courtesy, character, courage, and charity.

In 1910, the school moved to its present location at 1310 Bryant Street, and the first structure was the administration building, designed by architect Roy C. Heald in American Craftman style. In 1926, the Castilleja chapel was designed by architect Birge Clark, in a complimentary design to the existing administration building.

In 2007, Castilleja celebrated the 100th anniversary of its founding.

Expansion proposal 
In 2016, Castilleja announced its intentions to build an underground parking garage and upgrade and replace buildings to increase enrollment to 540 students. Because of the scale of the proposed development in an R1 zoned neighborhood, the project has experienced considerable opposition among neighboring residents. One concern has been traffic impact. In June of 2022, the Palo Alto City Council approved the school's permit to expand the school's enrollment, renovate its campus, and build a parking garage.

Recognition
Castilleja is accredited by the Western Association of Schools and Colleges and is a member of the National Association of Independent Schools, the National Coalition of Girls' Schools, and the College Board. In late 2007, the Wall Street Journal identified Castilleja School as one of the world's top 50 schools for its success. In 2009, Castilleja was given the highest accreditation rating by the Western Association of Schools and Colleges. Castilleja was named one of the Bay Area's Best Private Schools by San Jose Magazine.

Castilleja is recognized as the 18th best private high school and the #2 girls high school in the United States by Niche.com in their 2023 rankings.

Notable alumnae 

 Tori Anthony, pole vaulter
 Amy Chow, Olympic Gold medalist in gymnastics, Pediatrician
 Nancy Ditz, Olympic marathon runner
 Helen Katharine Forbes, 1908 graduate, muralist and painter
 Pansy Ho, Macau-born heiress and operator of casinos
 Josie Maran, actress and model
 Penny Pritzker, philanthropist; U.S. Secretary of Commerce
 Beatrice Judd Ryan, art dealer, curator
 Grace Slick, singer and songwriter

References

External links 
 Castilleja School
 Castilleja School assessed at Private School Review

Girls' schools in California
Buildings and structures in Palo Alto, California
Educational institutions established in 1907
High schools in Santa Clara County, California
Private high schools in California
Private middle schools in California
Preparatory schools in California
1907 establishments in California